Carlin Yoder is an American politician who served as a member of the Indiana Senate for the 12th district from 2008 to 2016.

Education
Yoder is a graduate of Indiana University South Bend.

Senate
Yoder represented the 12th district in the Indiana Senate from 2008 to 2016. During his tenure, he served as assistant majority caucus chair. The 12th district includes Elkhart county. He won election to the senate in 2008, receiving 27,496 votes while Democrat Donald Metzler-Smith received 16,569 votes. In 2012, he received 28,933 votes and defeated opponent Jim Ball who received 13,206 votes. Yoder became chairman of the Homeland Security and Transportation Committee and was the ranking member on the Veterans Affairs and the Military Committee. He did not seek a third term.

Personal
Yoder is married with five children.

References

External links
 official Indiana State Legislature site

Indiana University alumni
Living people
Indiana Republicans
21st-century American politicians
Year of birth missing (living people)